Aeropedellus is a genus of slant-faced grasshoppers in the family Acrididae. There are more than 20 described species in Aeropedellus.

Species
These 22 species belong to the genus Aeropedellus:

 Aeropedellus albilineatus Zheng, Li & Ding, 1995
 Aeropedellus ampliseptus Liang & Jia, 1992
 Aeropedellus arcticus Hebard, 1935
 Aeropedellus baliolus Mistshenko, 1951
 Aeropedellus chogsomjavi Altanchimeg, Chen & Nonnaitzb, 2014
 Aeropedellus clavatus (Thomas, 1873) (club-horned grasshopper) - type species (as Gomphocerus clavatus Thomas)
 Aeropedellus gaolanshanensis Zheng, 1984
 Aeropedellus helanshanensis Zheng, 1992
 Aeropedellus liupanshanensis Zheng, 1981
 Aeropedellus longdensis Zheng & He, 1994
 Aeropedellus longipennis Zheng, 1992
 Aeropedellus mahuangshanensis Zheng, 1992
 Aeropedellus nigrepiproctus Kang & Chen, 1990
 Aeropedellus nigrilineatus Zheng & Ma, 1995
 Aeropedellus ningxiaensis Zheng, 1993
 Aeropedellus prominemarginis Zheng, 1981
 Aeropedellus reuteri (Miram, 1907)
 Aeropedellus turcicus Karabag, 1959
 Aeropedellus variegatus (Fischer von Waldheim, 1846)
 Aeropedellus volgensis (Predtechenskii, 1928)
 Aeropedellus xilinensis Liu & Xi, 1986
 Aeropedellus zhengi Yang, 1994

References

Further reading

External links

 

 
Articles created by Qbugbot
Acrididae genera